Calliandra dysantha is a species of flowering plants of the genus Calliandra in the family Fabaceae. Is native to Brazil.

References

Germplasm Resources Information Network: Calliandra 

dysantha
Taxa named by George Bentham